Pierce is an English, Welsh, and Irish surname. The name is a cognate of French Pierre ('Peter').  Notable people with that surname include:

Disambiguation pages
Andrew Pierce (disambiguation), several people
Benjamin Pierce (disambiguation), several people
Bill Pierce (disambiguation), several people
Bobby Pierce (disambiguation), several people
Charles Pierce (disambiguation), several people
David Pierce (disambiguation), several people
Edward Pierce (disambiguation), several people
Franklin Pierce (disambiguation), several people
George Pierce (disambiguation), several people
Jack Pierce (disambiguation), several people
John Pierce (disambiguation), several people
James Pierce (disambiguation), several people
Larry Pierce (disambiguation), several people
Richard Pierce (disambiguation), several people
William Pierce (disambiguation), several people

Arts and letters
Aida Pierce (born 1956), Mexican actress and comedian
Bradley Pierce (born 1982), American voice-over artist and character actor
Chonda Pierce (born 1960), American Christian comedian often billed as "The Queen of Clean"
Gareth Pierce, Welsh actor
Jason Pierce (born 1965), English musician
Jeffrey Lee Pierce (1958–1996), American singer, songwriter, and guitarist
Jeffrey Pierce (born 1971), American actor, film director, and producer
Jo Carol Pierce {1944-2922), American songwriter, singer, playwright,  and screenwriter
Justin Pierce (1975–2000), English-American actor and professional skateboarder
Marjorie Pierce (1900–1999), American architect
Marvin Pierce (1893–1969), American publisher, president of McCall Corporation
Nat Pierce (1925–1992), American jazz pianist and arranger
Nicola Pierce (born 1969), Irish writer and ghost writer
Ponchitta Pierce (born 1942), television host and producer
Tamora Pierce (born 1954), American fantasy fiction author
Tedd Pierce (Edward Stacey Pierce III; 1906–1972), American animated cartoon writer, animator and artist
The Pierces: Allison and Catherine, American alternative band
Tim Pierce (born 1959), American session guitarist
Webb Pierce (1921–1991), American country music singer
Wendell Pierce (born 1962), American actor

Politics, law, and government
Abe E. Pierce, III (born 1934), African-American educator and mayor of Monroe, Louisiana
Barbara Bush (née Pierce, 1925–2018), First Lady of the United States 1989–1993
Franklin Pierce (1804–1869), the fourteenth president of the United States
Gilbert A. Pierce (1839–1901), author, journalist, playwright, member of the Indiana state legislature, eighth Governor of Dakota Territory, and representative for North Dakota in the U.S. Senate
Henry L. Pierce (1825–1896), U.S. Representative from Massachusetts
James F. Pierce (1830–1905), New York politician
Jane Pierce (1806–1863), wife of U.S. president Franklin Pierce
Joshua C. Pierce (1830-1904), American politician and businessman
Julian Pierce (?–1988), Lumbee Indian, chemist, lawyer, murdered at start of campaign to win electoral primary for position of superior court judge for Robeson, North Carolina
Maris Bryant Pierce (1811–1874), Seneca chief, lawyer, land-rights activist
Ray V. Pierce (1840–1914), U.S. Representative from New York State
Samuel Pierce (1922–2000), United States Secretary of Housing and Urban Development 1981–1989
Walter M. Pierce (1861–1954), Governor of Oregon and a member of the U.S. House of Representatives

Sciences
Benjamin C. Pierce,  professor of computer science at the University of Pennsylvania known for two books on type theory
G. W. Pierce (George Washington Pierce; 1872–1956), Harvard professor of physics and inventor in the development of electronic telecommunications
 W. Dwight Pierce (1881–1967), American entomologist

Sports
Aaron Pierce (American football) (born 1969), former professional American football player
Alec Pierce (born 2000), American football player
Anna Pierce (née Willard, born 1984), American middle-distance runner
Artavis Pierce (born 1996), American football player
Barry Pierce (born 1934), English professional footballer
Bemus Pierce (1873–1957), American football player and college sports coach
Bernard Pierce (born 1990), American football player
Billy Pierce (1927–2015), American professional baseball player
Brent Pierce (born 1969), Canadian curler
Buck Pierce (born 1981), retired American football player, now a coach
Caroline Pierce (golfer) (born 1963), English golfer
Charlie Pierce (born 1953), American sportswriter
Dameon Pierce (born 2000), American football player
Donald R. Pierce (born 1937), American retired jockey
Greg Pierce (1950–2016), Australian rugby league footballer, coach and administrator
Harry Pierce (1913–1975), Australian rugby league footballer
J. A. Pierce (1874–1956), American football coach
James Pierce (1900–1983), American football player, coach, and actor
James Pierce (curler) (born 1963), American Paralympian
Mary Pierce (born 1975), French-American retired tennis player
Michael Pierce (cricketer) (1869–1913), Australian cricketer
Mike Pierce (born 1980), American mixed martial artist
Paul Pierce (born 1977), American professional basketball player
Pierre Pierce (born 1983), American professional basketball player
Ricky Pierce (born 1959), American retired basketball player
Robbie Pierce (1959-2023), American off road racer and businessman
Rusty Pierce (born 1979), American former soccer player
Ryan Pierce (soccer) (born 1983), American soccer player
Shanghai Pierce, an early ring name of American professional wrestler Mark Canterbury (born 1964), better known as Henry O. Godwinn

Other
Byron Root Pierce (1829-1924), American dentist
Francis Junior Pierce (1924–1986), U.S. Navy Corpsman who received the Medal of Honor for actions in the Battle of Iwo Jima during World War II
Gus Pierce, alternative name for Augustus Baker Peirce (1840–1919); American traveler, riverboat captain and artist in Australia
James Pieronnet Pierce (c. 1825 – 1897), California entrepreneur
Lovick Pierce, American pastor, Chaplain in the War of 1812
Sarah Pierce (1767–1852), American educator

Fictional characters
Aaron Pierce (24 character), supporting character in American TV series 24
Annette Pierce, cafe owner in Japanese manga Black Cat
Brittany Pierce, character in American television series Glee
Donald Pierce, American comic book supervillain
Griffin Pierce-Taylor, character in Canadian TV series Degrassi: The Next Generation
Gwendolyn Pierce, a character in the American sitcom television series Charles in Charge
Hawkeye Pierce, main character in American book, film and television franchise M*A*S*H
Katherine Pierce, antagonist in American TV series The Vampire Diaries
Mildred Pierce, title character in the 1941 James M. Cain novel of the same title adapted into two films:
Mildred Pierce (film), a 1945 film
Mildred Pierce (TV series), a 2011 miniseries
Nica Pierce, a protagonist in the Child's Play movie franchise
Ryan Pierce, character in American TV series The West Wing, see List of The West Wing characters

See also
Jan Peerce (1904–1984), American operatic tenor born in New York City
Pearce (surname)
Peirce (surname)
Pierce (given name)

English-language surnames
Americanized surnames
Surnames of English origin
Anglicised Irish-language surnames
Surnames from given names